Caryodendron is a plant genus of the family Euphorbiaceae first described as a genus in 1860. The genus includes C. orinocense, known as the Inchi tree or Tacay nut. It is native to Central America and South America. They are dioecious trees.

Species
 Caryodendron amazonicum Ducke - Amazonas in Brazil
 Caryodendron angustifolium Standl. - Costa Rica, Panama, Colombia
 Caryodendron janeirense Müll.Arg. - Rio de Janeiro
 Caryodendron orinocense H.Karst - Colombia, Venezuela, Ecuador

References

Euphorbiaceae genera
Acalyphoideae
Dioecious plants